Firoz Merchant (born 1958) is an Indian businessman, and philanthropist based in the United Arab Emirates. He is the Founder and Chairman of Pure Gold Group, which consists of FGM Holding, Pure Gold Jewellers, Pure Gold Real Estate Development, La Moda, and Pure Gold Manufacturing.

Early life 
Merchant grew up in a family of modest means in India. He was one of nine children in a family of six boys and three girls. His father Gulam Hussain, was a real estate broker and his mother Malekbai was a housewife. The family’s real estate business often did not do well and they led a hand-to-mouth existence. When Firoz was 11 years old, he discontinued his education to support his father in the day-to-day running of the business.

After his marriage, he decided to visit Dubai for honeymoon with his wife Rozina. In Dubai, he was mesmerized by the Dubai Gold Souk and he felt a connection to the country and the gold trade. After he left Dubai, he expressed his desire to his father to move to Dubai and try his hand at the gold business, and in 1989, he moved to Dubai to set up his own gold and diamonds trading business, Pure Gold Jewellers.

Philanthropy work

Firoz Merchant received the "Community Service Medal & Award" from Lt. General Sheikh Saif Bin Zayed Al Nahyan, Deputy Prime Minister and Minister of Interior of the UAE at Interior Ministry.

Merchant has been involved in a number of philanthropic activities that have provided help and support for various communities. Merchant has contributed towards correctional institutions in order to release prisoners belonging to various nationalities jailed in the UAE. Merchant announced he will spend 1 million US dollars (3.8 million dirhams) to help free prisoners who are behind bars in UAE due to non-payment of debts. He has already paid 150,000 dirhams for the release of 132 prisoners from Ajman Central jail.

In May 2017, Merchant signed a memorandum of understanding with the UAE’s Faraj Fund. He also provided financial aid to Ajman Police to treat a policeman suffering from a neurological disorder. It was reported that an amount of Dh60,000 was allocated for his Chinese acupuncture treatment in Jordan.

In April 2018, Merchant signed an agreement with the University of Fujairah to provide scholarships to five needy Emirati female undergraduate students scoring 85 percent and above in each semester.

Recognition 
Merchant is a well-known business leader in the Middle East and widely quoted in the press. He is ranked No.26 on the Forbes Middle East List of Indian Owners 2014. Arabian Business placed him at No.28 on its 2014 Richest Indians in the GCC list with an estimated net worth of USD 435 million. He is also a board member of Dubai Diamond Exchange (DDE) and a member of Dubai Gold & Jewellery Group. In 2018, Merchant was ranked 25 in the Forbes Middle East Top 100 Indian Business owners in the Arab world. Merchant was also inducted into Abu Dhabi Police’s community wing 'We Are All Police' for helping with release of 560 inmates by paying off their debts.

In June 2019, Merchant was honored with the UAE permanent residency, known as the Golden Card, along with his family, for his contribution to the economy.

Awards 
 2017, Community Service Medal/ Award by Sheikh Saif Bin Zayed Al Nahyan; Deputy Prime Minister and Ministry of Interior
 2017, Business Excellence Award by the Indian Business and Professional Council (IBPC) 
 2017, Philanthropic Icon Award by the Indian Business and Professional Council (IBPC) 
2016, Philanthropic of the year by Indian CEO Awards by ITP

Personal life 
As of 2021, Merchant resides in Dubai with his family and spends his leisure time in horse riding.

References

External links 
 
 Official Facebook Page
Official Twitter account

Jewellery retailers of the United Arab Emirates
Jewellery retailers of India
Companies based in Dubai
Living people
Kerala
Year of birth missing (living people)